Michal Birner (born 2 March 1986) is a Czech ice hockey forward who is currently playing for HC Bílí Tygři Liberec in the Czech Extraliga (ELH).

Playing career
Birner was drafted 116th overall in the 2004 NHL Entry Draft by the St. Louis Blues. Prior to being drafted in the NHL, Birner was a CHL Import Draft- Barrie Colts 1st Round(8th) 2004

On 15 December 2007, the Blues traded Birner, along with Doug Weight and a 7th round draft choice to the Anaheim Ducks for Andy McDonald. Birner was assigned to the Ducks affiliate, the Portland Pirates where he remained for the rest of the 2007–08 season.

Birner started the 2008–09 season with the Iowa Chops before he was assigned to ECHL affiliate the Bakersfield Condors on 20 November 2008. Birner didn't report to the Condors and returned to Europe to play in the Finnish SM-liiga with Pelicans on 27 November 2008. Birner's season was cut short as he suffered a fractured hand after playing in only 6 games.

On 7 July 2009, Birner was signed by TPS for the 2009–10 season.

After two seasons with HC Lev Prague of the Kontinental Hockey League, with the team unable to offer him a new contract due to financial bankruptcy, Birner returned to continue his professional career in Finland, joining his third Liiga club KalPa on a one-year deal on 15 July 2014.

Career statistics

Regular season and playoffs

International

References

External links
 

1986 births
Barrie Colts players
HC Bílí Tygři Liberec players
Czech ice hockey forwards
HC Fribourg-Gottéron players
Iowa Stars players
KalPa players
HC Lev Praha players
Living people
Lahti Pelicans players
Ice hockey players at the 2018 Winter Olympics
Olympic ice hockey players of the Czech Republic
Peoria Rivermen (AHL) players
Portland Pirates players
Saginaw Spirit players
St. Louis Blues draft picks
HC Slavia Praha players
HC TPS players
Traktor Chelyabinsk players
People from Litoměřice
Sportspeople from the Ústí nad Labem Region
Czech expatriate ice hockey players in the United States
Czech expatriate ice hockey players in Canada
Czech expatriate ice hockey players in Finland
Czech expatriate ice hockey players in Russia
Czech expatriate ice hockey players in Switzerland